Cavareno (Ciavarén in local dialect) is a comune (municipality) in Trentino in the northern Italian region Trentino-Alto Adige/Südtirol, located about  north of Trento.

Cavareno borders the following municipalities: Amblar, Romeno, Ruffré-Mendola, Sarnonico, and Kaltern.

The important Families in Town are the Borzagas and the Zinis.

The village is situated on a high plateau at an elevation of 1,000 meters above sea level, surrounded by meadows and woods. Cavareno is a popular holiday destination for visitors seeking a serene and tranquil atmosphere, both in summer and winter.

The village of Cavareno has a rich and diverse history that can be traced back to its original Rhaeto-Romanic settlement under the Bishop's rule and further on under Austro-Hungarian rule. Today, the cultural events and gastronomic treats that are part of daily life in Cavareno testify to its glorious past. The landscape of the upper Val di Non valley, with its majestic mountains, forests, and meadows, enchants visitors from all over the world.

Cavareno is home to numerous societies and associations, which organize a rich cultural program throughout the year. Every August, the village transforms into a charming medieval town to celebrate the "Festa della Regola," also known as the "Charte della Regola." Sports enthusiasts can enjoy a range of activities, including tennis, volleyball, basketball, and a keep-fit trail.

With its breathtaking natural scenery, rich cultural heritage, and vibrant community, Cavareno is a must-visit destination for anyone traveling to Trentino, Italy.

Demographic evolution

References

Cities and towns in Trentino-Alto Adige/Südtirol
Nonsberg Group